"Sex on the Streets" is a song by British electronic music duo Pizzaman, consisting of John Reid and Norman Cook, and was released in 1995 as the second single from their only album, Pizzamania (1995). It samples a part of a 1974 sermon by American evangelist Jack van Impe and peaked at number-one on both the UK Dance Singles Chart and the UK Club Chart. In 2011, it was released in the Netherlands in a new mix as "Sex on the Streets 2011".

Critical reception
In his weekly UK chart commentary, James Masterton wrote, "Yet another dance record, this one at least standing out owing to its use of spoken sections as a hook. It is summery and commercial enough to be more of a hit than this but the prospects look fairly bleak." Daisy & Havoc from Music Weeks RM Dance Update rated the song four out of five, adding, "Is there a buzz about it? Oh yes, and you'd expect there to be after the stupendous "Trippin' on Sunshine"? But is it any good? Erm...well it's loads better than most other records flying around at the moment. It's full of excitement, sexual references, anti-establishment feelings, enormous never-fail party pianos, big breaks – it's full of everything and will be very successful on the nation's dancefloors and will appear on lots of mix CDs by popular party DJs." Another editor, James Hamilton, described it as "Norman Cook's terrific rattling and whistling percussive Latin-type leaper". 

Music video
A music video was produced to promote the single, directed by American filmmaker and photojournalist Michael Dominic. It was later published on YouTube in April 2012.

Impact and legacy
Tomorrowland included "Sex on the Streets" in their official list of "The Ibiza 500" in 2020.

Track listing
 12", UK (1995)"Sex on the Streets" (Pizzaman Club)
"Sex on the Streets" (Pizzaman Dub)
"Sex on the Streets" (Play Boys Fully Loaded Dub)

 12", Netherlands (2011)"Sex on the Streets" — 7:20
"Sex on the Streets" — 5:39
"Sex on the Streets" — 5:58

 CD single, UK (1995)"Sex on the Streets" (Radio Edit) — 3:48
"Sex on the Streets" (Pizzaman Club) — 6:44
"Sex on the Streets" (Pizzaman Dub) — 7:32
"Sex on the Streets" (Play Boys Fully Loaded Dub) — 9:03

 CD maxi, Germany (1995)'
"Sex on the Streets" (Pizzaman Club Mix) — 6:44
"Sex on the Streets" (Pizzaman Dub) — 7:32
"Sex on the Streets" (Play Boys Fully Loaded Dub) — 9:03

Charts

References

 

1995 singles
1995 songs
Eurodance songs
House music songs